Mount Matin is a massive, mainly snow-covered mountain which surmounts the mountainous divide north of Hotine Glacier on Kyiv Peninsula, on the west side of Graham Land, Antarctica. It was first charted by the French Antarctic Expedition, 1903–05, led by Jean-Baptiste Charcot, who named it after the newspaper Le Matin contributed generously to the cost of the expedition.

References

External links
 SCAR Composite Gazetteer of Antarctica.
 

Mountains of Graham Land
Graham Coast